Before and After may refer to:

Film and television
Before and After (film), a 1996 drama starring Meryl Streep and Liam Neeson
Before and After (1979 film), a TV film starring Patty Duke
Before and After (1980 film), a 1980 film starring Betty White
"Before and After" (Star Trek: Voyager), an episode of Star Trek: Voyager
"Before and After", an episode of The Golden Girls
"Before and After", an episode of Grey's Anatomy

Music
Before & After (Magnate y Valentino album)
Before & After (Tim Finn album)
Before & After (The Wannadies album)
Before and After, an album by Alec Su
"Before and After" (song), a 1965 hit by Chad & Jeremy
 Before and After, Chad & Jeremy's 1965 album of the same name.
"Before and After", a song by Rush from Rush

Other media
Before and After (novel), a novel by Rosellen Brown; basis for the 1996 film
Before and After (Hogarth), a work by the artist William Hogarth
 Before and After, a 1997 travel essay by Pat Murphy